Ketan Kadam is an Indian entrepreneur and restaurateur. He is the chairman and managing director of Impresa Hospitality Management Pvt. Ltd and has owned or co-owned a number of successful businesses, including Fire n Ice nightclub, the Maroosh restaurant chain, and the Two One Two Bar and Grill.

Education

Kadam, who grew up in Mumbai, has a Bachelor of Arts degree from the University of Mumbai and a Diploma in Hotel and Catering Technology.

Career
An early venture, Kadam launched the successful Fire n Ice nightclub in 1999 in Lower Parel along with partners Vishal Shetty, Rajiv Shah, and Neeraj Rungta. The nightclub was one of the first in Mumbai and one of the most popular, with a strong draw from the junior college and college crowd. In April 2014, Kadam and Shetty threw a reunion party on the 15th anniversary of the launching of Fire n Ice, which closed in 2004.

At 22 or 23 years of age, Kadam mortgaged his home in 2000 to help launch the Lebanese restaurant Maroosh. The restaurant expanded into a quick-service chain. In 2014, Kadam sold 43% of the chain's shares to UTV founder Ronnie Screwvala.

In 2010, Kadam and partners Arish Khajotia, Gaurav Kapur, and Jay Makhijani opened the fine dining Italian restaurant Two One Two Bar and Grill in Worli. In its review of the restaurant, The New York Times wrote that it was frequented by the "glamour set." Khajotia and Kadam had a public falling out in 2012 when the former disputed the fairness of share-holding agreements related to their business ventures.

In 2012, Kadam opened the first in a planned series of budget restaurants, the Cafe Sundance in Churchgate. In 2014, he opened quick-service restaurant "Sliders" in Bandra, the first in a planned chain.

As of 2013, he was working towards opening bars in Colaba, Bandra, and Malad.

References

Businesspeople from Mumbai
Year of birth missing
Indian restaurateurs